First Day Advent Christian Church is a historic church at the junction of Maryhill Hwy. and Stonehenge Avenue in Maryhill, Washington.

It was built in a Late Victorian/Gothic Revival style and was added to the National Register of Historic Places in 1991.

References

Churches in Washington (state)
Churches on the National Register of Historic Places in Washington (state)
Victorian architecture in Washington (state)
Buildings and structures in Klickitat County, Washington
National Register of Historic Places in Klickitat County, Washington